Wardi may refer to:

 Wardi, Iran - village in Tehran Province, Iran
 Wardi, Karnataka - village in Karnataka, India
 Alaa Wardi - Saudi singer and musician
 Ibn al-Wardi - Medieval Arab geographer
 Mohamed Saïd El Wardi - Moroccan athlete
 Mohammed Wardi - Nubian Sudanese singer and songwriter
 Burmese short-tailed shrew - Blarinella wardi

Arabic-language surnames